(in English: Maná Live) is the first live album (and seventh overall) released by the Mexican rock band Maná. After Iván González and César López left the group, Fher Olvera, Alex González, and Juan Calleros continued to perform as a trio. They recorded Maná en Vivo in August and September 1994 during their ¿Dónde Jugarán Los Niños? World Tour. The double CD includes material from concerts at the Universal Amphitheatre in Los Angeles; the Sports Arena in San Diego; the Aragon Ballroom in Chicago; the Teatro Gran Rex in Buenos Aires, Argentina; the Estadio de Chile in Santiago, Chile; and the Sala Estandard in Barcelona, Spain. Olvera, González, and Calleros were joined by Carlos Orozco on guitar, Sheila Ríos on vocals, and Juan Carlos Toribio on keyboards.

Track listing

CD1

CD2

Personnel
Fher Olvera – main vocals, acoustic guitar, electric guitar, harmonics, and group member
Alex González – main vocals, drums, electric percussions, and group member
Juan Diego Calleros – bass and group member

Additional personnel
Gustavo Orozco – guitar
Juan Carlos Toribio – keyboards
Sheila Rios – background vocals
Mercedes Granados – violin
Juan A. Mira – violin
Jose Saufor – violin
Pedro Santa Maria – violin
Silvia Villamor – viola
José Alberto Lopez – viola
Ignacio Lopez – cello
Oscar Agalberto – cello

Charts

Sales and certifications

References

Maná live albums
1994 live albums